Native copper is an uncombined form of copper that occurs as a natural mineral. Copper is one of the few metallic elements to occur in native form, although it most commonly occurs in oxidized states and mixed with other elements. Native copper was an important ore of copper in historic times and was used by pre-historic peoples.

Native copper occurs rarely as isometric cubic and octahedral crystals, but more typically as irregular masses and fracture fillings. It has a reddish, orangish, and/or brownish color on fresh surfaces, but typically is weathered and coated with a green tarnish of copper(II) carbonate (also known as patina or verdigris). Its specific gravity is 8.9 and its hardness is 2.5–3.

The mines of the Keweenaw native copper deposits of Upper Michigan were major copper producers in the 19th and early 20th centuries, and are the largest deposits of native copper in the world.  Native Americans mined copper on a small scale at this and many other locations,  and evidence exists of copper trading routes throughout North America among native peoples, proven by isotopic analysis.  The first commercial mines in the Keweenaw Peninsula (which is nicknamed the "Copper Country" and "Copper Island") opened in the 1840s. Isle Royale in western Lake Superior was also a site of many tons of native copper. Some of it was extracted by native peoples, but only one of several commercial attempts at mining turned a profit there. An archived record of native copper originally found up river from Lake Superior, on the west branch of the Ontonagon River, via being dragged by a glacier is seen in the Ontonagon Boulder now in the possession of the Department of Mineral Sciences, National Museum of Natural History, Smithsonian Institution. 

Another major native copper deposit is in Coro Coro, Bolivia.

The name copper comes from the Greek kyprios, "of Cyprus", the location of copper mines since pre-historic times.

Gallery

See also

References

Further reading
Thurner, Arthur W.  Strangers and Sojourners - A History of Michigan's Keweenaw Peninsula  (Detroit, Michigan, U.S.A.: Wayne State University Press, 1994) .B

External links 

Native element minerals
Copper
Cubic minerals
Minerals in space group 225